Events from the year 1979 in Michigan.

The Associated Press (AP) selected the top Michigan news stories of 1979 as follows:
 Chrysler Corporation's financial troubles, including a loss for 1979 estimated to exceed $1 billion, a federal loan guarantee program of $1.5 billion approved at the end of the year, and $462 million in concessions from workers;
 A 22% decline in U.S. automobile sales and the indefinite layoffs of 141,000 workers in the automobile industry;
 New collective bargaining agreements between the United Auto Workers and the Big Three reached without a strike for the first time since prior to 1964;
 (tie) Teacher strikes in Detroit and other communities that impacted hundreds of thousands of students in the fall;
 (tie) The selection of Detroit as the host city for the 1980 Republican National Convention;
 Toxic chemical dumping sites in need of cleanup;
 An $18 million budget deficit for Wayne County;
 Blockades by striking independent truck drivers during the summer;
 A court dispute over Indian fishing rights, including the use of gill nets, in Lake Michigan; and
 A record-setting $450,000 fine imposed the Nuclear Regulatory Commission on Consumers Power for safety violations at the Palisades Nuclear Generating Station on Lake Michigan.

Office holders

State office holders

 Governor of Michigan: William Milliken (Republican) 
 Lieutenant Governor of Michigan: James Damman (Republican)/James H. Brickley (Republican)
 Michigan Attorney General: Frank J. Kelley (Democrat)
 Michigan Secretary of State: Richard H. Austin (Democrat)
 Speaker of the Michigan House of Representatives: Bobby Crim (Democrat)
 Majority Leader of the Michigan Senate: William Faust (Democrat)
 Chief Justice, Michigan Supreme Court:

Mayors of major cities
 Mayor of Detroit: Coleman Young
 Mayor of Grand Rapids: Abe L. Drasin
 Mayor of Flint: James W. Rutherford
 Mayor of Lansing: Gerald W. Graves
 Mayor of Ann Arbor: Louis Belcher (Republican)

Federal office holders
 United States Senator from Michigan: Donald W. Riegle Jr. (Democrat)
 United States Senator from Michigan: Carl Levin (Democrat) 
 United States Representative, District 1: John Conyers (Democrat)
 United States Representative, District 2: Carl Pursell (Republican)
 United States Representative, District 3: Howard Wolpe (Democrat)
 United States Representative, District 4: David Stockman (Republican)
 United States Representative, District 5: Harold S. Sawyer (Republican)
 United States Representative, District 6: Bob Carr (Democrat)
 United States Representative, District 7: Dale Kildee (Democrat)
 United States Representative, District 8: J. Bob Traxler (Democrat)
 United States Representative, District 9: Guy Vander Jagt (Republican)
 United States Representative, District 10: Donald J. Albosta (Democrat)
 United States Representative, District 11: Robert William Davis (Republican)
 United States Representative, District 12: David Bonior (Democrat)
 United States Representative, District 13: Charles Diggs (Democrat)
 United States Representative, District 14: Lucien N. Nedzi (Democrat)
 United States Representative, District 15: William D. Ford (Democrat)
 United States Representative, District 16: John Dingell (Democrat)
 United States Representative, District 17: William M. Brodhead (Democrat)
 United States Representative, District 18: James Blanchard (Democrat)
 United States Representative, District 19: William Broomfield (Republican)

Population

Sports

Baseball
 1979 Detroit Tigers season – Under managers Les Moss, Dick Tracewski, and Sparky Anderson, the Tigers compiled an 85–76 record and finished fifth in the American League East. The team's statistical leaders included Steve Kemp with a .318 batting average, 26 home runs, and 105 RBIs, Jack Morris with 17 wins, and Aurelio Lopez with a 2.41 earned run average (ERA).

American football
 1979 Detroit Lions season – The Lions, under head coach Monte Clark, compiled a 2–14 record. The team's statistical leaders included Jeff Komlo with 2,238 passing yards, Dexter Bussey with 625 rushing yards, Freddie Scott with 929 receiving yards, and Benny Ricardo with 55 points scored.
 1979 Michigan Wolverines football team – Under head coach Bo Schembechler, the Wolverines compiled an 8–4 record and were ranked No. 18 in the final AP Poll. The team's statistical leaders included John Wangler with 1,431 passing yards, Butch Woolfolk with 990 rushing yards and 78 points scored, and Doug Marsh with 612 receiving yards.
 1979 Michigan State Spartans football team –  Under head coach Darryl Rogers, the Spartans compiled a 5–6 record. The team's statistical leaders included Bryan Clark with 800 passing yards, Steve Smith with 972 rushing yards, and Eugene Byrd with 559 receiving yards.

Basketball
 1978–79 Detroit Pistons season – Under head coach Dick Vitale, the Pistons compiled a 30–52 record and finished fourth in the NBA's Central Division. The team's statistical leaders included M. L. Carr with 1,497 points, Leon Douglas with 664 rebounds and Kevin Porter with 1,099 assists. The team moved from Cobo Hall to the Pontiac Silverdome starting with the 1978–79 season.
 1978–79 Michigan State Spartans men's basketball team – Under head coach Jud Heathcote, the Spartans compiled a 26–7 record and won both the Big Ten Conference championship and the 1979 NCAA Division I Basketball Tournament in a finals matching Magic Johnson's Spartans against Larry Byrd's Indiana State Sycamores. The Spartans' statistical leaders included Greg Kelser with 602 points and 278 rebounds and Magic Johnson with 269 assists.
 1978–79 Detroit Titans men's basketball team – The Titans compiled a 22–6 record under head coach Smokey Gaines.
 1978–79 Michigan Wolverines men's basketball team – Under head coach Johnny Orr, the Wolverines compiled a 15–12 record. The team's statistical leaders include Mike McGee with 511 points, Phil Hubbard with 238 rebounds, and Marty Bodnar with 61 assists.

Ice hockey
 1978–79 Detroit Red Wings season –  Under head coach Bobby Kromm, the Red Wings compiled a 23–41–16 record and finished fifth in the National Hockey League's Norris Division. The team's statistical leaders included Vaclav Nedomansky with 38 goals and 73 points and Reed Larson with 49 assists. The team's regular goaltenders were Jim Rutherford and Rogie Vachon.

Other

Music
Albums and singles by Michigan artists or centered on Michigan topics that were released or became hits in 1979 include the following:
 "My Sharona", written by Oak Park native Doug Fieger, was released in April 1979 and became the year's No. 1 hit as reflected on the Billboard Year-End Hot 100 singles of 1979.
 "Old Time Rock and Roll" by Detroit's Bob Seger was released as a single in March 1979. It has since become a standard in popular music and was ranked number two on the Amusement & Music Operators Association's survey of the Top 40 Jukebox Singles of All Time in 1996.
 "We've Got Tonite" by Bob Seger was released in 1978 and became a hit in 1979; it reached No. 13 on the Billboard Hot 100 and was ranked No. 94 on the Billboard Year-End Hot 100 singles of 1979.
 "Heartache Tonight, co-written by Detroit natives Glenn Frey, Bob Seger and J.D. Souther (along with Don Henley), was released by The Eagles in September 1979 and reached No. 1 on the Billboard Hot 100. Glenn Frey sang the lead vocals.
 Stumblin' In by Detroit native Suzi Quatro (duet with Chris Norman) was released in the US in January 1979 and reached No. 4 on the Billboard Hot 100.
 Journey Through "The Secret Life of Plants", a studio album by Detroit native Stevie Wonder, was released in October. The album included the single "Send One Your Love"; it reached No. 1 on the Adult Contemporary chart and No. 4 on the Billboard Hot 100.
 The Boss, a studio album by Detroit native Diana Ross, was released in May and was certified gold. The single of the same name was ranked No. 97 on the Billboard Year-End Hot 100 singles of 1979.
 "How You Gonna See Me Now", a single by Detroit native Alice Cooper, was released in late 1978, reached No. 12 on the Billboard Hot 100 and was ranked No. 87 on the Billboard Year-End Hot 100 singles of 1979.
 State of Shock, the fifth solo studio album by Redford native Ted Nugent, was released in May and reached No. 18 on the Billboard album chart. 
 New Values, a studio album by Michigan native Iggy Pop, was released in April 1979. The album included the song "Don't Look Down", later recorded by David Bowie.
 La Diva, an album by Aretha Franklin, was released in September 1979 and sold less than 75,000 copies in the US -- the poorest selling album in Franklin's Atlantic catalogue.

Chronology of events

January

February

March

April

May

June

July

August

September

October

November

December

Births
 January 31 - Robert Saleh, American football coach currently defensive coordinator of the San Francisco 49ers, in Dearborn, Michigan
 July 20 - Ed Swiderski, winner on season 5 of the reality TV show The Bachelorette, in Monroe, Michigan
 November 28 - Daniel Henney, actor (My Father, Shanghai Calling, Criminal Minds: Beyond Borders), in Carson City, Michigan
 December 28 - Marvin Winans Jr., singer and producer, in Detroit
 December 30 - Tommy Clufetos, drummer for Ted Nugent, Alice Cooper, Rob Zombie, Ozzy Osbourne, and Black Sabbath, in Detroit

Gallery of 1979 births

Deaths
 September 4 - Turkey Stearnes, Negro leagues player inducted into Baseball Hall of Fame, at age 78 in Detroit
 October 27 - Charles Coughlin, Roman Catholic priest who had up to 30 million listeners to his weekly radio broadcast in the 1930s, at age 88 in Bloomfield Hills, Michigan
 November 23 - Charles E. Potter, U.S. Congressman (1947-1952) and Senator (1952-1959) from Michigan, at age 63 in Washington, D.C.
 November 27 - Jerome Cavanagh, Mayor of Detroit (1962-1970), at age 51 in Lexington, Kentucky

Gallery of 1979 deaths

References